Alrai TV is a private Kuwaiti satellite TV channel. It was launched in 2004 and it is part of Al Rai Media Group, which publishes Al Rai, a daily newspaper in Kuwait.

It is the first private television channel in Kuwait.

References

External links 
  
Live streaming website 

2004 establishments in Kuwait
Television channels and stations established in 2004
Arabic-language television stations
Television stations in Kuwait
Mass media in Kuwait